The 3rd Regiment "Granatieri di Sardegna" is a unit of the Italian Army's infantry arm's Granatieri (Grenadiers) speciality. The regiment was active for a short time in 1849 during the First Italian War of Independence and then reformed in 1926 and assigned to the Infantry Division "Granatieri di Sardegna". In 1935-36 the regiment's I Battalion fought in the Second Italo-Ethiopian War. In 1939 the regiment became an autonomous unit and moved to Tirana in occupied Albania. There the regiment was renamed 3rd Regiment "Granatieri di Sardegna e d'Albania" and participated in the Greco-Italian War. For its conduct during the war the regiment was awarded Italy highest military honor the Gold Medal of Military Valour. After the announcement of the Armistice of Cassibile on 8 September 1943 the regiment was disbanded by invading German forces.

On 1 January 1976 he regiment was reformed as battalion sized training unit, which in was used to reform the regiment. In 2002 the regiment was disbanded, but on 4 October 2022 the flag and traditions of the regiment were assigned to the Command and Tactical Supports Unit "Granatieri di Sardegna" of the Mechanized Brigade "Granatieri di Sardegna".

History

First formation 
On 23 March 1848 the First Italian War of Independence began and the Royal Sardinian Army's Guards Brigade formed two regiments for the war: the 1st Grenadiers Regiment and the 2nd Grenadiers Regiment. On 10 February 1849 a Provisional Grenadier Guards Regiment was formed, which consisted of the freshly levied I and II Provisional Grenadier Guards battalions. On 11 March 1849 this regiment was renamed 3rd Grenadier Guards Regiment. After the Sardinian defeat in the war the 3rd Grenadier Guards Regiment was disbanded in June 1849.

Second formation 
After World War I the Royal Italian Army reduced reduced the two grenadier regiments of the Brigade "Granatieri di Sardegna" to two battalions per regiment, with three grenadier companies and one machine gunners company per battalion. In 1926 the army reformed its infantry and created numbered infantry brigades, which consisted of three infantry regiments. On 31 October 1926 the Brigade "Granatieri di Sardegna" was renamed XXI Infantry Brigade. On the same date the brigade's two regiments were renamed 1st Regiment "Granatieri di Sardegna", respectively 2nd Regiment "Granatieri di Sardegna". The XXI Infantry Brigade was the infantry component of the 21st Territorial Division of Rome. To complete the XXI Infantry Brigade on 4 November 1926 the 3rd Regiment "Granatieri di Sardegna" was formed in Viterbo. The new regiment's I Battalion and depot were formed with personnel ceded by the 1st Regiment "Granatieri di Sardegna", while the II Battalion and the new regiment's command were formed with personnel ceded by the 2nd Regiment "Granatieri di Sardegna". All three grenadier regiments consisted of a command, a command company, two grenadier battalions, and a depot.

Interwar years 
On 8 February 1934 the 21st Territorial Division of Rome changed its name to Infantry Division "Granatieri di Sardegna". In 1935-36 the regiment's I Battalion was deployed to East Africa for the Second Italo-Ethiopian War, where the battalion fought in the Second Battle of Tembien. A further 11 officers and 130 enlisted were transferred from the regiments to units deployed for the war.

On 6 April 1939 a provisional regiment with elements from all three grenadier regiments was formed for the Italian invasion of Albania. In the night from 7 to 8 April a battalion of that regiment was airlifted to Tirana with the rest of the provisional regiment following by sea a few days later. As the Royal Italian Army reorganized its divisions as binary divisions the 3rd Regiment "Granatieri di Sardegna" left the Infantry Division "Granatieri di Sardegna" and became an autonomous unit. On 25 July 1939 the 3rd Regiment "Granatieri di Sardegna" moved from Viterbo to Tirana, where it replaced the provisional regiment, which was repatriated and disbanded in Rome on 28 July.

In Albania the regiment was initially renamed Grenadiers of Albania Regiment (3rd Regiment "Granatieri di Sardegna"), which in 1940 was changed to 3rd Regiment "Granatieri di Sardegna e d'Albania".

World War II 
At the outbreak of World War II the regiment consisted of a command, a command company, three grenadier battalions, a support weapons battery equipped with 65/17 infantry support guns, and a mortar company equipped with 81mm Mod. 35 mortars. In fall 1940 the regiment, together with the Regiment "Lancieri di Aosta" (6th), Regiment "Lancieri di Milano" (7th), and Regiment "Cavalleggeri Guide" (19th), formed the Littoral Grouping, which, as per tradition for Italian grenadier units, was deployed on the extreme right of the front for the Italian invasion of Greece.

The regiment fought in November 1940 in the Battle of Elaia–Kalamas, and then on the coast at Cape Kepi i Stilit. In 1941 the regiment fought on Mount Mali i Golikut, in the Kurvelesh region and on the slopes of Mount Scindeli. After the German invasion of Greece the regiment was assigned to the 11th Army and moved to Athens as occupation force.For its conduct during the war the regiment was awarded a Gold Medal of Military Valour 

After the announcement of the Armistice of Cassibile on 8 September 1943 the regiment was disbanded by invading German forces.

Cold War 

During the 1975 army reform the Italian Army disbanded the regimental level and newly independent battalions were granted for the first time their own flags. On 31 December 1975 the 80th Infantry Regiment "Roma" was disbanded and the next day the regiment's II Battalion in Orvieto was renamed 3rd Grenadiers Battalion "Guardie" and assigned the flag and traditions of the 3rd Regiment "Granatieri di Sardegna". The battalion was assigned to the Central Military Region and consisted of a command, a command platoon, and three recruits training companies. On 1 November 1976 the Infantry Division "Granatieri di Sardegna" was reorganized as Mechanized Brigade "Granatieri di Sardegna" and the battalion was assigned to the brigade, as the brigade's recruits training battalion.

On 20 October 1992 the 3rd Grenadiers Battalion "Guardie" lost its autonomy and the next day the battalion entered the reformed 3rd Regiment "Guardie" as I Grenadiers Battalion. During 1997 the regiment left the Mechanized Brigade "Granatieri di Sardegna" and joined the army's Training Brigade. On 30 April 2002 the regiment was disbanded and the flag of the regiment was transferred to the Shrine of the Flags in the Vittoriano in Rome.

Command and Tactical Supports Unit "Granatieri di Sardegna" 
On 1 December 1948 the Connections Battalion "Granatieri di Sardegna" was formed in Rome and assigned to the Infantry Division "Granatieri di Sardegna". The battalion consisted of a command, a command platoon, and three connections companies - one for division headquarter, one for infantry regiment, and one for artillery regiment. On 1 October 1952 the Connections Speciality became an autonomous speciality of the Engineer Arm, with its own school and gorget patches. On 16 May 1953 the speciality adopted the name Signal Speciality and consequently the Connections Battalion "Granatieri di Sardegna" was renamed Signal Battalion "Granatieri di Sardegna" on 1 July 1953. In March 1954 the battalion was reduced to a company consisting of a command, a command platoon, two Marconists platoons, a signal center platoon, and a phone signals platoon. On 1 April 1959 the company was again expanded to battalion and now consisted of a command, a command platoon, and two signal companies.

During the 1975 army reform the Infantry Division "Granatieri di Sardegna" was reduced to Mechanized Brigade "Granatieri di Sardegna" and consequently on 30 September 1975 the Signal Battalion "Granatieri di Sardegna" was reduced to Signal Company "Granatieri di Sardegna". On 30 October 1976 the company was disbanded and its personnel formed two signal platoons, which were assigned to the Command and Signal Unit "Granatieri di Sardegna". On 1 November 1977 the two signal platoons entered the reformed Signal Company "Granatieri di Sardegna".

On 4 October 1993 the brigade's Engineer Company "Granatieri di Sardegna" was assigned to the Command and Signal Unit, which was renamed as Command and Tactical Supports Unit.

2022 Reactivation 
On 4 October 2022 the name, flag and traditions of the 3rd Regiment "Granatieri di Sardegna" were assigned to the Command and Tactical Supports Unit "Granatieri di Sardegna" of the Mechanized Brigade "Granatieri di Sardegna", which on that date was renamed 3rd Granatieri Command and Tactical Supports Unit "Guardie".

As of reactivation the unit is organized as follows:

  3rd Granatieri Command and Tactical Supports Unit "Guardie", in Rome
 Command Company
 Signal Company

See also 
 Mechanized Brigade "Granatieri di Sardegna"

External links
 Italian Army Website: 3° Reparto Comando e Supporti Tattici Granatieri "Guardie"

References

Granatieri Regiments of Italy
Grenadier regiments